Cordulephya divergens is a species of dragonfly of the family Cordulephyidae, 
commonly known as the clubbed shutwing. 
It inhabits streams in the Sydney Basin, Australia.

Cordulephya divergens is a small to tiny, black or purplish-black dragonfly with yellowish markings. It rests with its wings folded above its body in a similar manner to a damselfly.

Gallery

See also
 List of Odonata species of Australia

References

Cordulephyidae
Odonata of Australia
Endemic fauna of Australia
Taxa named by Robert John Tillyard
Insects described in 1917